Anisy is a commune in the Calvados department in the Normandy region of north-western France.

The inhabitants of the commune are known as Anisiens or Anisiennes

Geography
Anisy is located some 8 km north by north-west of Caen and 4 km south of Douvres-la-Délivrande. It can be accessed by the D79 road from Caen passing through the west of the commune and continuing to Anguerny. The village can be accessed by the D220 road from Mathieu in the east passing through the village and the commune and continuing to Villons-les-Buissons in the south-west. The D220A branches off the D220 in the village and goes south to Cambes-en-Plaine. The D141 from Mathieu to Anguerny also passes through the north-eastern tip of the commune. Apart from the village the commune is entirely farmland.

History
The commune was founded in the 11th century by the Anisy family.

Anisy was liberated by The Queen's Own Rifles of Canada on the first evening of the Normandy landings on 6 June 1944. The Rifles were the only Regiment to reach its assigned objective that day.

Heraldry

Administration

List of Successive Mayors

Population

Sites and monuments
Church of Saint Peter (12th and 13th centuries), registered as a historical monument in 1927.

Notable people linked to the commune
Madeleine Barbulée, French actress, born on 2 September 1910 at Nancy, Meurthe-et-Moselle. She died on 1 January 2001 in Paris and was buried in the cemetery at Anisy.

See also
Communes of the Calvados department

References

Communes of Calvados (department)